Ojuju is a 2014 Nigerian zombie thriller film, written and directed by C.J. Obasi. The film which has a zero-budget, stars Gabriel Afolayan, Omowunmi Dada, and Kelechi Udegbe. It premiered at the 4th Africa International Film Festival, where it won the award for "Best Nigerian Movie".

Cast 
Gabriel Afolayan as Romero
Omowumi Dada as Peju
Kelechi Udegbe as Emmy 
Chidozie Nzeribe as Fela
Brutus Richard as  Gaza
Meg Otanwa as Alero
Paul Utomi as The First Ojuju
Yvonne Enakhena as Aisha
Jumoke Ayadi as Iya Sikiru
Tommy Oyewole as Officer Lade
Emeka Okoye as The Chemist
Kelechi Joseph as The Kid
Klint da Drunk (cameo)

Production

C.J. Obasi had been visiting a friend in a slum location. He observed unique features of the area; which included for example, the area has a single point of entry and exit, the area also had only one source of water, which everyone fetched from. Obasi then decided to develop a story based on this premise, since it was feasible to create a story based on the consequences of pollution to the common Nigerian. In an interview, Obasi stated that he chose the name "Ojuju" because he didn’t want to use the word "zombies" in any manner or form, as he believed that if such an outbreak occurred in the slums of Lagos, the "Zombie" word would hardly be used to describe it. Obasi also felt it would be more realistic to eliminate any supernatural elements to the plot, and localize the Zombie genre for the Nigerian environment, rather than trying to do a Hollywood-version of what a zombie film ought to be.
 
The first actor to be cast in Ojuju was Gabriel Afolayan, who would play the lead character of Romero in the film. Next was Paul Utomi, an actor who Obasi had wanted to work with for some time. Other members of the main cast, including Omowunmi Dada and Yvonne Enakhena, were in an open audition for the film.

Principal photography for Ojuju began in November 2013, in a close-knit slum location in Ikeja, Lagos. Additional establishment scenes were shot around Bariga, while the police station scenes were shot in "Compact E-Schedular", a film and television production company at Opebi, Ikeja in February 2014. Initial budget for the film was ₦5,000,000 ($30,000); however, no investor showed any interest in funding the film. Eventually, Obasi, along with Oge Obasi, the producer of the film struck pro bono deals regarding equipment leasing, and with cast and crew. Most of the extras featured in the film were real inhabitants of the slum, where the film was shot.

Music
The film was scored by  Wache Pollen, with additional soundtrack by Beatoven. Original background scores were composed by David Jones David. The lyrics of the closing song “Run Things” was penned by C.J. Obasi.

Release
A teaser trailer for Ojuju was released to the public on 10 August 2014. The film premiered at the 2014 Africa International Film Festival on 11 November 2014.

Reception

Critical response 
Todd Brown of Twitch Film concludes: "There is no question at all that Ojuju has its limitations. But it also shows a clarity of vision and a broad base of skills that mark Obasi as a director to watch out for". Frank Scheck of The Hollywood Reporter wrote: "Although made on an obviously minuscule budget, this enterprising genre pic is very well crafted. Infused with both sly humor and genuine thrills, it puts many similarly themed American efforts to shame, with the exoticism of its setting only adding to the overall effect." In a 2019 IndieWire article, Ojuju was listed in the Best Zombie Films of All Time category.

Awards and recognition

Cultural references 
While exploring the evil dead theme, the film's hero, Romero, is named after Night of the Living Dead director George A. Romero.

References

External links
 
 

2014 films
Nigerian thriller films
Yoruba-language films
2014 horror films
Nigerian zombie films